Karin Roisin Bryan is a New Zealand oceanography academic, and as of 2019 is a full professor at the University of Waikato. She is also the director of the Environmental Research Institute.

Academic career

After a 1997  PhD titled  'Bar-trapped edge waves.'  at Dalhousie University, Bryan moved to the University of Waikato, rising to full professor.

Much of Bryan's work is related to human-used beaches.

Selected works 
 Emami, A., Bryan, K., & De Lange, W. (2019). Spatial patterns in groundwater seepage and surf zone morphology: Muriwai Beach, New Zealand. Journal of Coastal Research: an international forum for the littoral sciences, 35(1), 186–195. doi:10.2112/JCOASTRES-D-17-00180
 Cussioli, M. C., Bryan, K. R., Pilditch, C. A., de Lange, W. P., & Bischof, K. (2019). Light penetration in a temperate meso-tidal lagoon: Implications for seagrass growth and dredging in Tauranga Harbour, New Zealand. Ocean and Coastal Management, 174, 25–37. doi:10.1016/j.ocecoaman.2019.01.014
 Gorman, Richard M., Karin R. Bryan, and Andrew K. Laing. "Wave hindcast for the New Zealand region: nearshore validation and coastal wave climate." New Zealand Journal of Marine and Freshwater Research 37, no. 3 (2003): 567–588.
 Barnard, Patrick L., Andrew D. Short, Mitchell D. Harley, Kristen D. Splinter, Sean Vitousek, Ian L. Turner, Jonathan Allan et al. "Coastal vulnerability across the Pacific dominated by El Niño/Southern Oscillation." Nature Geoscience 8, no. 10 (2015): 801.
 Senechal, Nadia, Giovanni Coco, Karin R. Bryan, and Rob A. Holman. "Wave runup during extreme storm conditions." Journal of Geophysical Research: Oceans 116, no. C7 (2011).
 Coco, Giovanni, Nadia Senechal, A. Rejas, Karin R. Bryan, S. Capo, J. P. Parisot, Jenna A. Brown, and Jamie HM MacMahan. "Beach response to a sequence of extreme storms." Geomorphology 204 (2014): 493–501.
 Gorman, Richard M., Karin R. Bryan, and Andrew K. Laing. "Wave hindcast for the New Zealand region: deep‐water wave climate." New Zealand Journal of Marine and Freshwater Research 37, no. 3 (2003): 589–612.

References

External links
 
 

Living people
Academic staff of the University of Waikato
New Zealand women academics
Year of birth missing (living people)
Dalhousie University alumni
New Zealand oceanographers
New Zealand women writers